The Desert Mountains are a mountain range located in west-central Nevada south of the Lahontan Reservoir and north of the town of Yerington. They are known as Pa'pa-dso-ki in the Goshiute dialect of Shoshoni. The range is located in Lyon and Churchill counties.

References

Mountain ranges of Nevada
Mountain ranges of Lyon County, Nevada
Mountain ranges of Churchill County, Nevada